Khaleja is a 2010 Indian Telugu-language action comedy film written and directed by Trivikram Srinivas. The film stars Mahesh Babu, Anushka Shetty and Prakash Raj, while Shafi , Sunil, Brahmanandam and Ali play supporting roles. This film marks Babu's return as an actor after a three-year hiatus in his second collaboration with Trivikram after Athadu. The film is released on 7 October 2010. The film won two Filmfare South awards for Best Male Playback Singer and Best Lyricist. The film was listed in the Film Companion "25 Greatest Telugu Films of the Decade.". This film is considered to be a cult classic and one of the best films in Mahesh Babu's filmography.

Plot

A remote village named Pali in Andhra Pradesh is struck by an unknown disease, with several villagers dying each month. The village tantrik predicts a powerful man will come to their rescue as God. He assigns his assistant Siddhappa with the duty to find a man with such supernatural power and bring him to their village.

A Gemini TV reporter named Babji arrives at Rajasthan to shoot a travel documentary where he comes across Alluri Seetharama Raju aka Raju, a short-tempered cab driver. Raju introduces himself to Babji and tells him the reason for him being in Rajasthan. Raju met a woman named Subhashini, whom he considers as bad luck to him, as she created a never-ending disasters for him and his cab. Later, he drives a scientist and his assistant to the Geological Survey office. Whilst returning a wallet to the scientist, Raju unwittingly witnesses the scientist and his assistant getting murdered, the latter of whom falls on and damages his cab.

Meanwhile, Subhashini's father Durga Prasad, a sugercane business mogul; brings her a match, the son of his business partner named Gopal Krishnan “GK”. The main reason for the proposal is to establish a strong project between Durga Prasad and GK. GK's son takes Subhashini to Rajasthan for a date. However, Subhashini runs away after she sees a packet of condoms from GK's son's pocket. GK finds out about it, informs Prasad and promises to bring Subhashini back. He sends his henchman Govardhan to Rajasthan in search of Subhashini. To Raju's dismay, Subhashini finds him and Babji and learns that she is in Rajasthan. Subhashini, Babji, Raju, and a botanist named Tom Cruise find Girdwala and hand the cheque to Bilavar's family, but Raju refuses to ask for the  upon seeing the family's poverty.

Tom is forced to remain in the village as the villagers want to punish him for cutting a sentimental plant. Babji goes away with his shooting team but does not offer them a ride as he is scared of Subhashini's antics. As Raju and Subhashini wait for the bus to leave Girdwala, Govardhan's men stab Raju and take Subhashini after knocking her unconscious. However, Raju survives and kills almost all of Govardhan's men, while Govardhan himself escapes from the scenario, leaving Subhashini behind. Just as Raju goes unconscious, Sidhappa discovers him after all the omens the Tantrik predicts come true. Sidhappa and Subhashini take Raju to Pali, where the villagers treat his wounds.

After waking up, he finds all of the villagers praising him as their God, much to his dismay. He finds out from Subhashini that they are in Pali and that the villagers see him as the supernatural godsend that the Tantrik described and who will rescue the village. After a medical camp that is set up to help the villagers is ordered to shut down on GK's orders, Raju fights the men sent to quell unrest and unwittingly revives a dead girl, solidifying the villagers' belief in his powers. Initially reluctant to help them out, Raju escapes to Hyderabad, where he hands over Subhashini to her father. After realizing that Tom and Siddappa followed him to Hyderabad, Raju tests his fate and realizes the concept of deityhood. 

Deciding to solve the mystical series of deaths in the village he and Tom track down the doctor who had the medical camp closed, the dean of the medical college who signed the closure order and Govardhan. Raju interrogates them and discovers that the plastic factory in Pali deposits its wastes in the drinking water source nearby, thus contaminating and killing the villagers. Interrogating Durga Prasad's lawyer Miriyam, Raju finds out that GK wanted Subhashni and his son married so that he could use Prasad's sugarcane to create plastic. Encountering the scientist's assistant, Raju forces her to reveal the truth, that the scientist, Dr Paranji had stopped at Girdwal, and discovered the idol of Krishna they worshipped to be made of iridium, a valuable metal. 

Tracing its origin back to Pali, Paranji reported his findings to GK, who planned to mine the iridium for his own profit but couldn't convince Paranji to side with him. Warning him that it would not end well for him if he tried to go public, GK decided to use the villagers's superstitions against them and make them voluntarily vacate the village so that he could mine the iridium without any issue. Despite GK's warning to Paranji not to reveal it to anybody else, Praranji tries to inform the Geological Survey about the deposits, which was why he and Bilavar, who was with him, were killed that day. GK also decided to dispose of Raju as he was an unexpected witness. 

GK lured Raju to Girdwala under the cover of delivering the insurance cheque to Bilavar's family, which was planted and was attacked by Govardhan. GK needed the strong plastic glass from the plastic factory to pack the iridium. GK kills his assistant and Govardhan for their failures. He then heads to Pali to kill all the villagers before the truth goes out to the public. The Tantrik warns GK that his greed would be his downfall, that Raju would save the villagers and bring death to GK, and keep Pali's population at 534, not letting any more die in the process. Raju arrives at Pali along with Sidhappa. 

GK shoots and kills Sidhappa, reducing the population to 533. Before dying, Siddhappa dies peacefully in Raju's arms. Enraged, Raju massacres GK's men and severs GK's palm. A terrified GK tries to run with Raju in pursuit. Raju catches up to him, and GK dies when a religious knife hanging from a nearby tree falls and stabs him in the neck after Raju curses him to die. The Tantrik reveals that Raju fulfilled his mission as God to save the village because although Sidhappa was killed, another baby was born to keep the village's population at 534. A new flag is being raised in the honor of child's birth.

Cast

Music
The soundtrack was composed by Mani Sharma. The music was released on 27 September 2010. The starcast of the movie, including Mahesh Babu, actress Anushka Shetty, music director Mani Sharma and director Trivikram Srinivas released the audio at Radio Mirchi FM radio station in the Hyderabad. Mahesh Babu's wife Namrata Shirodkar was also present. The album contains six songs and the lyrics are written by Ramajogayya Sastry and Sirivennela Seetharama Sastry.

Reception
Sify rated 3 out of 5 explained "No doubt, Mahesh is the cynosure of the movie, shouldering the entire responsibility." MSN rated 3 out of 5 and described the film as "just an above average venture", commenting, "Mahesh Khaleja is worth a watch for Mahesh's strong screen presence and charisma. Mahesh carries off his role with elan and looks superb too. Anushka looks pretty but doesn't share a good on-screen chemistry with Mahesh. The first half of the film is dull. It does pick up pace in the second half but the narration is inconsistent and tedious. The climax is little better. Rediff gave a 3 out of 5 rating and noted "The duo of Mahesh-Trivikram delivers a product that is watchable, entertaining with good humour, couple of well-orchestrated action sequences and songs and with a bit to take home as well. It's Mahesh's show all the way, much to the delight of his fans. Mahesh is the soul of the movie, be it his dialogue delivery, his action, his dances or emotions, he is effortless.

CNN-IBN gave a mixed review stating "The movie is all about Mahesh Babu and he occupies almost every frame in the movie. Back after a gap of 4 years, Mahesh looks great with stylish costumes. The movie deals with a serious theme but director Trivikram Srinivas mixes it with a lot of unnecessary situational comedy which dilutes the intensity of the movie."

Awards
Filmfare Awards South
Won
 Best Lyricist – Telugu: Ramajogayya Sastry – "Sada Siva"
 Best Male Playback Singer – Telugu: Ramesh Vinayagam & N. C. Karunya – "Sada Siva"
Nominated
 Best Supporting Actor – Telugu – Shafi

Notes

References

External links
 

Indian action films
Films about mining
2010s road movies
Indian road movies
Works about mining
Films set in Rajasthan
Films shot in Rajasthan
Films directed by Trivikram Srinivas
Indian films based on actual events
Films scored by Mani Sharma
2010 action films
2010 films
2010s Telugu-language films
Films shot in Maharashtra